Uropterygius genie is a moray eel found in the western Indian Ocean, specifically the Red Sea.

References

genie
Fish described in 1995